The year 1855 in architecture involved some significant architectural events and new buildings.

Events
 October 15 – The second of the Prussia Columns is inaugurated, on the 60th birthday of their instigator, King Frederick William IV of Prussia.

Buildings and structures

Buildings completed

 The Palais de l'Industrie for the Exposition Universelle in Paris, France, mainly designed by the architect Jean-Marie-Victor Viel and the engineer Alexis Barrault.
  in Paris, designed by Louis-Auguste Boileau, is completed.
 Church of St John the Evangelist, Preston, Lancashire, England, designed by E. H. Shellard, is completed.
 The Old Stone Church (Cleveland, Ohio) in the United States, designed by Charles Heard and Simeon Porter.
 Church of Saint Bartholomew, Brugherio in Italy, rebuilt to the design of Giacomo Moraglia, is completed.
 St Mary's Cathedral, Killarney, Ireland (Roman Catholic), to the design of Augustus Pugin following his death.
 The Victoria Tower of the Palace of Westminster in London, England, as The King's Tower, designed by Charles Barry and Augustus Pugin.
 Neues Museum, Berlin, Prussia, designed by Friedrich August Stüler.
 The original Smithsonian Institution Building in Washington, D.C., to the 1846 design of James Renwick, Jr.
 Fremantle Prison in Western Australia, opened.

Awards
 RIBA Royal Gold Medal – Jacques Ignace Hittorff.
 Grand Prix de Rome, architecture – Honoré Daumet.

Births
 May 12 – Alfred Gelder, English architect and politician active in Kingston upon Hull (died 1941)
 November 24 – Thomas Sully, self-trained American architect (died 1939)

Deaths
 January 5 – Mihály Pollack, Austrian-born Neoclassical architect working in Pest, Hungary (born 1773)
 March 3 – Robert Mills, American architect, designer of the Washington Monument (born 1781)
 March 11 – James Gillespie Graham, Scottish architect (born 1776)
 March 27 – Richard Cromwell Carpenter, English ecclesiastical architect (born 1812)
 September 12 – John McCurdy, Irish architect, official architect to Trinity College, Dublin (born 1824)
 December 20 – Thomas Cubitt, English master builder (born 1785)

References

Architecture
Years in architecture
19th-century architecture